Rockin' with Curly Leads is the ninth rock album by British instrumental (and sometimes vocal) group The Shadows, released in 1973 through Columbia (EMI).

Track listing

Personnel
Hank Marvin – Electric and acoustic guitars
Bruce Welch – Electric and acoustic guitars
John Farrar – Electric and acoustic guitars
Brian Bennett – Drums, percussion and piano
Alan Tarney – Bass guitar

Charts

References 

1973 albums
EMI Columbia Records albums
The Shadows albums
Albums with cover art by Hipgnosis